Alvin Brown is an American politician from Florida who served as mayor of Jacksonville, Florida, from 2011 to 2015. He was the first African American to be elected to that position. Brown succeeded John Peyton as mayor after winning the 2011 mayoral election. In the 2015 race, he lost his re-election bid to Republican Lenny Curry.

Early life and education
Brown was born in Beaufort, South Carolina. He moved to Jacksonville in 1981 and attended Edward Waters College and Jacksonville University, where he earned his bachelor's and Master of Business Administration degrees.

Career 
Brown was an intern for Senator Bill Nelson while Nelson was a member of the United States House of Representatives. He worked on the staff of the Clinton-Gore transition team in 1992 and 1993, and then began work in the Clinton administration as a member of Ron Brown's staff at the United States Department of Commerce. Brown was GU Politics Fellow in Spring 2016.

Government service 
During the 1990s he served as an advisor to Andrew Cuomo who was the Secretary of Housing and Urban Development, President Bill Clinton, and Vice President Al Gore. In the Clinton administration, he served as deputy administrator for community development, rural business and Cooperative development services at the United States Department of Agriculture; executive director of the Office of Special Actions at the Department of Housing and Urban Development; executive Ddrector of the White House Community Empowerment Board; co-chair of the White House Task Force on Livable Communities; and senior advisor for urban policy and vice chair of the White House Community Empowerment Board.

After serving in the Clinton administration, Brown worked as the executive-in-residence at Jacksonville University; president and CEO of the Willie Gary Classic Foundation; executive director of the Bush/Clinton Katrina Interfaith Fund; and chairman of the board of the National Black MBA Association.

In November 2020, Brown was named a candidate for United States secretary of housing and urban development in the Biden administration.

Mayor of Jacksonville 
Brown entered the race for mayor of Jacksonville in 2011. The incumbent Republican, John Peyton, was barred from a third term. Widely considered an underdog in the March primary election, Brown came in second in the six-person race to face the frontrunner, Republican Mike Hogan, in the runoff election. On May 17, Brown narrowly defeated Hogan by 1,648 votes in what was called the closest mayoral election in Jacksonville history. Brown became the first African American ever elected Mayor of Jacksonville, as well as the first Democrat elected since Ed Austin in 1991. The win was considered a major upset in light of the momentum gained by the Republican Party and the conservative Tea Party movement in the 2010 elections, and a significant victory for the Florida Democratic Party. Brown was sworn in as mayor on July 1, 2011.

Brown lost his 2015 re-election bid to Republican Lenny Curry.

National Transportation Safety Board 
In August 2022, Brown was nominated to serve as a member of the National Transportation Safety Board by President Joe Biden.

Personal life 
While living in Washington, Brown met his wife Santhea. They have two sons, Joshua and Jordan.

References

External links 

Official Website of the City of Jacksonville, Florida - Mayor

1961 births
African-American mayors in Florida
Florida Democrats
Jacksonville University alumni
Living people
Mayors of Jacksonville, Florida
People from Beaufort, South Carolina
21st-century African-American people
20th-century African-American people